Sibel Catherine Galindez née Ergener (born November 25, 1967), is an American actress primarily from 1993 until 2002. She has starred in range of Movies, TV Shows and Series such as The Last Big Thing, Sliders and Beverly Hills, 90210. She most notably portrayed the role of Lieutenant Elizabeth "Skates" Hawkes and Dixie on the CBS TV Series, JAG. She has also worked as a Performing Arts Director at Portsmouth Abbey School in Portsmouth, Rhode Island.

References

External links
 

1967 births
Harvard University alumni
Living people
American television actresses
Place of birth missing (living people)
21st-century American women